Pegaeophyton nepalense is a plant species reported from Nepal, Bhutan, Sikkim and Xizang (= Tibet). It is found high in the Himalayas at elevations of over 4000 m (13,000 feet).

Pegaeophyton nepalenseis a very small perennial herb rarely more than 2 cm tall, with an underground caudex and a rosette of leaves above ground. Leaves have relatively long petioles up to 14 mm long. Blades are ovate to almost round, up to 4 mm wide. Flowers number 3-8 per plant, up to 3 mm across, with white petals. Fruits are egg-shaped to almost spherical, up to 2 mm across, each with 2-4 seeds. It grows among moss, under rocks by streams, and alpine grasslands.

References

Brassicaceae
Flora of Nepal
Flora of Sikkim
Flora of Bhutan
Flora of Tibet